Olympia 71 is an album of songs by Dalida recorded live at the Olympia in Paris in 1971 and released in 1972.

Track listing
 "Non"
 "Chanter les voix"
 "Hene matov"
 "Tout au plus"
 "Toutes les femmes du monde"
 "Les choses de l'amour"
 "Ils ont changé ma chanson"
 "Une vie"
 "Avec le temps"
 "Ciao amore, ciao"

References
 Dalida Official Website

External links
 Dalida Official Website "Discography" section

Dalida albums
Albums recorded at the Olympia (Paris)
1972 live albums